Ben Siriki Dembélé (born 7 September 1996) is an Scottish-Ivorian professional footballer who plays as a winger and  striker
for Ligue 1 club Auxerre, on loan from Premier League club AFC Bournemouth.

Dembélé is known for his speed, taking on players with his dribbling ability, and holding the ball bringing others into play. At the age of 12, Dembélé started his career with Dundee United's youth system. He then moved to playing in their academy. Dembélé returned south of the border joining the Nike Football Academy in May 2016, he had a trial with Championship clubs Barnsley and Huddersfield Town in September 2016. In May 2017, Dembélé moved to Grimsby Town signing his first professional contract. On 22 June 2018, he joined Peterborough United on a three-year deal for an undisclosed fee. On 31 January 2022, he joined AFC Bournemouth on a three-and-a-half year deal, for an undisclosed fee. 

Born in Ivory Coast, Dembélé is also eligible to represent England and Scotland at international level.

Club career
Dembélé was born in Ivory Coast. He relocated with his family to London in search of better footballing opportunities, before moving to Govan, Scotland in 2004. He attended Lourdes Secondary School in Glasgow, and started his career with Dundee United where he spent three years in their youth system. He then moved to Ayr United in their U20s academy team in 2015.

Several amateur players including Dembélé attended the 'Nike Most Wanted' 2016 trials, where he won a place at the Nike Football Academy, he was the only Scottish player selected for the St George's Park outfit, developing his skills in front of elite coaches and mentors. While at the academy, he had trials with EFL Championship clubs Barnsley in August and Huddersfield Town in September 2016 and was due to sign for them, however, due to suffering an injury he was out for four months and went back to the Nike Academy in January 2017.

Grimsby Town
After training and featuring in a behind-closed-doors friendly against Barnsley at Blundell Park, Dembélé joined EFL League Two side Grimsby Town on 25 May 2017 on a one-year contract, the club having the option to retain him for a second year. He did have the opportunity to trial with fellow League Two club Stevenage, Dembélé said: "I still had a few clubs to go before making my decision, but once I found out I was joining this club to sign my very first professional contract it felt amazing."

He made his full professional debut with Grimsby on 5 August 2017, in their 3–1 victory at Chesterfield, where he ran at pace through the midfield beating three men and placed a through ball to Sam Jones, which put Grimsby into a 2–0 lead. Dembélé scored his first goal for Grimsby in the 2–1 win at Port Vale on 7 October 2017, a through ball from Luke Summerfield, which Dembélé latched onto and rounded the keeper to win the game. Ten days later, he scored a brace in a 3–2 victory at Cheltenham Town.

Dembélé was awarded EFL Young Player of the Month for October 2017.

In June 2018, Dembélé submitted a transfer request.

Peterborough United
Dembélé joined Peterborough United on a three-year deal for an undisclosed fee on 22 June 2018.

AFC Bournemouth
On 31 January 2022, Dembélé joined EFL Championship side AFC Bournemouth on a three-and-a-half year contract, for an undisclosed fee. Commenting on the move amidst interest from other clubs, Dembélé stated that Bournemouth was his top choice because of the higher chance of promotion and the club's style of play. He scored his first goal for the club in his second appearance; a last minute winner against Blackpool on 12 February 2022.

Loan to Auxerre 
On 31 January 2023, Dembélé moved to Ligue 1 club Auxerre on loan until the end of the season.

Style of play
Dembélé is ambidextrous although mainly right footed, he primarily plays on the left-wing in 4-3-3 and 4-2-3-1 formations. He prefers to play as a striker in a 4-4-2 formation. Dembélé is known for his speed, taking on players with his dribbling skills and holding the ball bringing others into play.

Personal life
Siriki has a younger brother, Karamoko, who plays for French club Brest. Both are eligible to play for England, Scotland or Ivory Coast respectively.

Career statistics

Honours
AFC Bournemouth
Championship runner-up: 2021–22

Individual
EFL Young Player of the Month: October 2017

References

External links
Siriki Dembélé profile at the Grimsby Town F.C. website

1996 births
People from Govan
Footballers from Glasgow
Footballers from Lambeth
Ivorian emigrants to the United Kingdom
Sportspeople of Ivorian descent
Living people
People educated at Lourdes Secondary School
Ivorian footballers
Association football wingers
Dundee United F.C. players
Ayr United F.C. players
Grimsby Town F.C. players
Peterborough United F.C. players
AFC Bournemouth players
AJ Auxerre players
English Football League players
Ligue 1 players
Ivorian expatriate footballers
Ivorian expatriate sportspeople in England
Expatriate footballers in France
Ivorian expatriate sportspeople in France